Eoin Ó Murchú is a writer and retired journalist in both Irish and English, a political activist and a former member of Official Sinn Féin/the Workers' Party, and the Communist Party of Ireland.

Biography

Background
Ó Murchú was born and reared in England, where he joined the Connolly Association and got involved in the republican movement. He studied at Trinity College Dublin and was a founding member of the Republican Club in the college and served as its chairman.

Official Sinn Féin and Communist Party
Ó Murchú edited the newspaper of the official republican movement United Irishman and served on the Ard Comhairle of Official Sinn Féin. His 1971 work Culture and Revolution in Ireland, formed a synthesis of Gaelic revival and Maoist themes. Ó Murchú was aligned with the faction who moved the Official Republican movement away from the armed struggle towards a socialist and electoral path. After joining the Communist party he served as its southern secretary, and also edited the party's newspaper The Irish Socialist.

RTÉ and journalism
He worked as political correspondent for RTÉ Raidió na Gaeltachta. Although retired from RTE, Ó Murchú remained active as a columnist and commentator appearing on Vincent Browne Tonight programme on TV3 from time to time. He also writes Political and Irish language columns for An Phoblacht.

He is a writer for Tuairisc.ie and has written for Trinity News.

Publications
Culture and Revolution in Ireland, Eoin Ó Murchú, Official Sinn Féin/Repsol, 1971
 The Workers' Party, Its Evolution and Its future, A Critique, Eoin Ó Murchú, Communist Party of Ireland, 1982

References

External links
Eoin Ó Murchú at Twitter

Alumni of Trinity College Dublin
Communist Party of Ireland politicians
Irish communists
Irish journalists
Living people
Workers' Party (Ireland) politicians
Year of birth missing (living people)